Carlos Alfredo Reinoso Arriagada (born July 8, 1970) is a Mexican football manager and former player.

Personal life
He is the son of the former Chile international footballer of the same name Carlos Reinoso.

References

External links

1970 births
Living people
Sportspeople of Chilean descent
Footballers from Mexico City
Mexican footballers
Association football midfielders
Tigres UANL footballers
Toros Neza footballers
Club Puebla players
Liga MX players
Mexican football managers